The YES Shelter For Youth and Families, formerly known as the Youth Emergency Shelter is located in the city of Peterborough, Ontario, Canada. It is a homeless shelter for males and females between the ages of 16 and 24 as well as families. After over 40 years of planning, YES opened its doors on December 20, 2002. The official opening of the shelter occurred in February 2003 and was attended by both local and federal politicians including the Honourable Jane Stewart. While YES is a shelter for homeless youth and families, it is also an umbrella organization for other programs concerning this group of at-risk youth.

Emergency Shelter for Youth

YES is open and staffed 24 hours a day, 365 days a year. The shelter provides homeless youth and families with shelter, food, and support with accessing community resources in order to break the cycle of homelessness. The length of stay is determined on a case-by-case basis, but the facility is not designed to provide permanent or long-term housing. Youth who stay at the shelter are expected to develop and follow a personal service plan with concrete goals concerning housing, schooling, and employment. They are also encouraged to develop strategies to work on personal challenges, ranging from past abuse or traumatic experiences to various addictions.

First Stage Housing
YES operates a second stage housing facility located in Peterborough, Ontario known as Abbott House. This facility is a 10-bed 'rooming house' style home available to youth in need of semi-supported independent living. Residents of Abbott House are eligible to stay for 1 year but must be able to function independently (buying of groceries, paying rent, etc.). An on-site 'mentor' is available to the residents of Abbott House for support in pursuing their independent living goals.

Carriage House
Carriage House is an on-site classroom staffed by one full-time and two part-time secondary school teachers. Carriage House is available to residents of YES, Abbott House and members of the community who have problems succeeding in a traditional school environment.

Street Job
Street Job was a six-month-long group work experience for 10 'street youth' between the ages of 16 and 24 who are unemployed and out of school. It was meant as an alternative to pan-handling with Street Job participants working on a number of community development projects of benefit to others in the area, while gaining much needed first job experience.

External links
 YES Shelter For Youth and Families

See also
 Emergency shelter

Organizations based in Peterborough, Ontario